Mekhi Wingo is an American football defensive tackle for the LSU Tigers. He previously played for the Missouri Tigers.

High school career
Wingo attended De Smet Jesuit High School in Creve Coeur, Missouri. As a senior, he was the Missouri Gatorade Football Player of the Year after recording 54 tackles and five sacks.> He committed to the University of Missouri to play college football.

College career
As a true freshman at Missouri in 2021, Wingo played in 11 games with three starts and had 27 tackles, one sack and one interception 48 he returned for a touchdown. After the season, he transferred to Louisiana State University (LSU). In his first year at LSU, he started 12 of 13 games, recording 47 tackles and three sacks. He was named a third-team All-American by the Associated Press.

References

External links
LSU Tigers bio

Living people
Players of American football from Missouri
American football defensive tackles
Missouri Tigers football players
LSU Tigers football players